Islas Caracas are an archipelago in the Caribbean Sea consists of 2 islands, which belong to Venezuela, located in eastern Sucre state, north of the peninsula of Santa Fe, west of the Manaure peninsula and the Venado island  and east of the island Picúa Grande, from the December 19, 1973 under Decree No. 1534 belong to the Mochima National Park.

These islands are uninhabited, showing landscapes with xerophytic vegetation and rocky coral formations

Caracas Islands consist of two main islands
Eastern Caracas (Caracas del Este)
Western Caracas (Caracas del Oeste)

Gallery

See also
Geography of Venezuela

References

External links
Location map

Caribbean islands of Venezuela
Geography of Sucre (state)
Mochima National Park
Archipelagoes of Venezuela